The Motorola i886 is the first ever qwerty slider style cellular telephone designed for use with iDEN Networks. It was released for Nextel on January 9, 2011.

Background
Like the Motorola i850, i760, and even the i920/i930, the i886 supports both iDEN 800mhz and 900mhz bands. The iDEN 900 band is also supported pending Sprint's petition to move all iDEN spectrum away from the 800 band for public safety workers to utilize it.

Unlike the i1, the i886 does not operate under Android but has some elements of the Android OS. While this is the case, it utilizes Bluetooth2.1 support with OBEX and hands-free earpiece compliance.

The i886 adds selective dynamic group call, MP3 support, MIDI/WAV support, and TransFlash/Micro SD support for cards up to 32 GB-to-date. The i886 also features a digital camera, but the resolution has been increased to 2 megapixels, and video recording.

The i885 is the first phone to feature mo-sms on Sprint Nextel's iDEN network.

There are currently no criticisms as of this time, neither there are any opportunities to find any for the timebeing.

Regulatory information

See also
Motorola iDEN phone models
Sprint Nextel

External links

Motorola i886 Manual in PDF Format
Motorola i886 Specs

I886
IDEN mobile phones
Mobile phones introduced in 2011